Freestyle skiing at the 2019 Winter Universiade was held at the Sopka Cluster of the Winter Sports Academy in Krasnoyarsk from 3 to 11 March 2019.

Men's events

Women's events

Mixed events

Medal table

References

External links
Results
Results Book – Freestyle Skiing

 
Freestyle skiing
Winter Universiade
2019